Eden Prairie is a city  southwest of downtown Minneapolis in Hennepin County and the 16th-largest city in the State of Minnesota, United States. At the 2020 census, it had a population of 64,198. The city is adjacent to the north bank of the Minnesota River, upstream from its confluence with the Mississippi River.

Set in the Twin Cities' outer suburbs, Eden Prairie is part of the southwest portion of Minneapolis–Saint Paul, the 16th-largest metropolitan area in the United States, with approximately 3.7 million residents. The community was designed as a mixed-income city model, and is home to 7,213 commercial firms, including the headquarters of SuperValu, C.H. Robinson Worldwide, Winnebago Industries, Starkey Hearing Technologies, Lifetouch Inc., SABIS, and MTS Systems Corporation. It contains the Eden Prairie Center mall and is the hub of SouthWest Transit, providing public transportation to three adjacent suburbs. The television stations KMSP and WFTC are based in Eden Prairie. The nonprofit news organization Eden Prairie Local News (EPLN) also serves the community.

The area features numerous municipal and regional parks, conservation areas, multi-purpose trails, and recreational facilities. Popular recreational areas include Staring Lake, Lake Riley, Purgatory Creek, Miller Park, Round Lake, and the Minnesota River Bluffs Regional Trail. 

Eden Prairie has been featured as one of Money magazine's "Best Places to Live" in America several times since 2006. It earned first place in the 2010 survey and second place in 2016.

History

For most of its existence, Eden Prairie was a slow-growing, pastoral village on the far southwest fringes of the Twin Cities. Between 1880 and 1960, Eden Prairie's population only grew from about 739 to 2,000.

Native Americans were the first to live in the area. Originally, the land was part of the Great Dakota Nation, but when the Ojibwe arrived from the Great Lakes region, the tribes began to clash over the land. The Ojibwe were armed with knives and guns traded to them by white settlers and fur traders, and after years of bloody warfare the Ojibwe had forced the Dakota to give up all their land east of the Mississippi River, and north of the Crow Wing River, land that did not include what is now Eden Prairie.

In 1853, John H. McKenzie and Minnesota Territory secretary Alexander Wilkins platted the town of Hennepin along the Minnesota River in what is now southeastern Eden Prairie. According to area historian Helen Holden Anderson, topographic disadvantages for the transport of agricultural goods caused Hennepin to be eclipsed by other towns in the region, and the town soon vanished from maps.

On May 25, 1858, a battle was fought between the Dakota and the Ojibwe in the southern part of Eden Prairie, just north of the Minnesota River, an area known as Murphy's Ferry. The Ojibwe wished to "avenge the murder" of one of their people by the Dakota the previous fall. The Ojibwe had 200 warriors and the Dakota somewhere between 60 and 70, but the Dakota proved victorious, wounding the young Ojibwe chief.

The tribes continued to fight over territory well into the 1860s, even after the "Sioux Uprising" of 1862, when most Dakota people were removed from Minnesota.

Among the notable Native Americans who lived in the Eden Prairie area was Chief Shoto. Born into the band of Chief Wabash, he went on to be the chief of the Red Wing Dakota tribe for 15 years, leaving them and becoming Chief of the "Little Six" band of Dakota until the uprising in 1862, during which he became a scout for then Governor Sibley from 1862 to 1870, returning to the Little Six band in 1872. He died in 1899 at age 99 at his home in Eden Prairie.

In 1851, a treaty opened land west of the Mississippi River to settlement allowing pioneers to settle in what is now Eden Prairie. Many early farmhouses remain in the town and can be found on the National Register of Historic Places. One of these early settlers was John Cummins, an Irish-born immigrant who built what is now known as the "Cummins-Phipps-Grill House" with his wife Mattie in 1880. Manuscripts indicate that Cummins was an avid and respected horticulturist, scientist, and farmer; he used his farmland to experiment with different strains of apples and grapes to try to find one that could withstand the harsh climate in Minnesota. The Cummins family sold this property to the Phipps family in 1908.

Eden Prairie's town board held its first meeting in a log schoolhouse on May 11, 1858, the same day Minnesota became a state. Eden Prairie's farming community grew slowly over the years. Flying Cloud Airport was the first sign of big development in 1946. The 1960s and 1970s were decades of growth for the city's parks and recreation system. In the mid-1970s, the community gained a higher profile with the addition of Interstate Highway 494 and the Eden Prairie Center mall. Eden Prairie became a village in 1962 and a statutory city in 1974. One of Eden Prairie's popular lakes, Staring Lake, is named for Jonas Platt Staring (1809–1894), who built the first house by the lake.

Etymology
The city was originally named "Eden" in 1853 by the writer Elizabeth F. Ellet, who chose the name because of her admiration of the "beautiful prairie" that occupies the southern part of town.

Geography

Interstate 494, U.S. Highways 169 and 212, and Minnesota State Highway 5 are four of the city's main routes.

Eden Prairie's land consists of rolling hills and bluffs overlooking the Minnesota River, with zones of prairie and mixed (primarily deciduous) forests. Eden Prairie has parks, such as Staring Lake Park and Bryant Lakes Regional Park, with trails for running and biking.

Demographics

2010 census
As of the census of 2010, there were 60,797 people, 23,930 households, and 16,517 families residing in the city. The racial makeup of the city was 81.7% White, 5.6% African American, 0.2% Native American, 9.2% Asian, 1.0% from other races, and 2.3% from two or more races. Hispanic or Latino residents of any race were 3.0% of the population.

There were 23,930 households, of which 36.3% had children under age 18 living with them, 58.2% were married couples living together, 8.0% had a female householder with no husband present, 2.8% had a male householder with no wife present, and 31.0% were non-families. 25.1% of all households were made up of individuals, and 6.1% had someone living alone who was 65 or older. The average household size was 2.53 and the average family size was 3.08.

The median age in the city was 37.6. 26.4% of residents were under 18; 6.5% were between 18 and 24; 27.6% were from 25 to 44; 30.8% were from 45 to 64; and 8.6% were 65 or older. The gender makeup of the city was 48.5% male and 51.5% female.

2000 census
As of the census of 2000, there were 54,901 people, 20,457 households, and 14,579 families residing in the city. The racial makeup of the city was 90.7% White, 2.3% African American, 0.2% Native American, 4.8% Asian, 0.0% Pacific Islander, 0.50% from other races, and 1.5% from two or more races. Hispanic or Latino of any race were 1.6% of the population.

There were 20,457 households, of which 42.6% had children under age 18 living with them, 61.3% were married couples living together, 7.7% had a female householder with no husband present, and 28.7% were non-families. 22.0% of all households were made up of individuals, and 3.4% had someone living alone who was 65 or older. The average household size was 2.68 and the average family size was 3.20.

In the city, 30.5% of the population was under the age of 18, 6.2% from 18 to 24, 35.6% from 25 to 44, 22.9% from 45 to 64, and 4.9% was 65 or older. The median age was 34. For every 100 females, there were 96.3 males. For every 100 females 18 and over, there were 92.8 males.

The median income for a household in the city was $54,328, and the median income for a family was $105,177. Males had a median income of $59,303 versus $37,196 for females. The per capita income for the city was $38,854. About 2.8% of families and 3.5% of the population were below the poverty line, including 7.9% of those under 18 and 6.3% of those 65 or older.

Economy
Eden Prairie is home to more than 2,800 businesses, including many that specialize in logistics/distribution, retail and wholesale trade, health care, industrial equipment, communications, and information technology.

Top employers
According to the city's 2016 Comprehensive Annual Financial Report, its top employers were:

Video game retailer FuncoLand, which operated in over 400 locations nationwide before its acquisition and merger, was headquartered in Eden Prairie.

Arts and culture

Eden Prairie Veterans Memorial
In 2008, Eden Prairie raised roughly $500,000 from the community to build a veterans memorial. The memorial has two components, service to country and world peace. It was constructed in Purgatory Creek Park near the intersection of Technology Drive and Prairie Center Drive. Sculptor Neil Brodin designed and constructed two bronze sculptures. The service-to-country sculpture represents a wounded airman carried over the shoulders of a soldier in the battlefield.

The world-peace sculpture depicts a woman service member touching a globe, honoring women who have served. Community members could purchase a place on the memorial for the names of loved ones who served in any branch of the U.S. service in any war or conflict. Minnesota-based Cold Spring Granite provided Mesabi black granite for the memorial's walls.

Sports
The 2017 USA Rink Bandy League Cannon Cup Playoffs took place at the Eden Prairie Rinks.

Government
Eden Prairie is in Minnesota's 3rd congressional district, represented by Dean Phillips, a Democrat. City council officials include Mayor Ron Case and council members Brad Aho, Mark Freiberg, Kathy Nelson and PG Naraynan. The city manager is Rick Getschow.

Law enforcement
The Eden Prairie Police Department has a chief, a captain, three lieutenants, about 66 sworn law-enforcement officers, and 30 civilian staff. The department was established on January 1, 1973. It has three divisions: Patrol, Investigations and Support. The Patrol Division includes SWAT and police dog elements.

Education

Public schools
The first school in Eden Prairie was Anderson School, a schoolhouse near a farm. At the time of its construction, it was in the center of the city. The former Eden Prairie Consolidated School, built in 1924, is now the school district Administration Building and is next to Central Middle School.

Eden Prairie operates eight K-12 schools, six elementary (PreK-5) schools (including one Spanish immersion), one middle school (6-8), and one high school (9-12). Eden Prairie High School is Minnesota's fifth-largest high school, with about 2,600 students, and is near the grounds of Round Lake Park and the Eden Prairie Community Center.

List of schools
Oak Point Elementary
Prairie View Elementary
Cedar Ridge Elementary
Forest Hills Elementary 
Eden Lake Elementary
Eagle Heights Spanish Immersion
Central Middle School
Eden Prairie High School

The district has a record of success, with 11 Eden Prairie High School juniors scoring perfect ACT scores in 2017. Some students attend public schools in other school districts chosen by their families under Minnesota's open enrollment statute.

Charter schools
As of the 2017–18 school year, Eden Prairie is home to one charter school, the Performing Institute of Minnesota Arts High School.

Private schools
Eden Prairie has one private school, The International School of Minnesota, which offers a private, non-denominational, college preparatory education for students from preschool through grade 12. The school, founded in 1985, features non-selective admissions and year-round open enrollment, daily world language education beginning in preschool, and 19 AP courses at the upper school level. The student body consists of 85% local residents and 15% international students.

Colleges
There is one technical college campus in Eden Prairie. Hennepin Technical College (whose main campus is in Brooklyn Park, Minnesota) has an enrollment of roughly 7,000 full- and part-time students. It offers day and night classes.

Infrastructure
The city has its own police department.

Notable people
 Andrew Alberts, ice hockey player for Vancouver Canucks
 Leith Anderson, president of U.S. National Association of Evangelicals
 Adam Bartley, actor
 David Baszucki, CEO and co-founder of Roblox
 Michael Bland, former drummer for Prince and current drummer for Nick Jonas & the Administration
 Rachel Bootsma, Olympic swimmer
 Jasper Brinkley, football player for Minnesota Vikings
 Laurie Coleman, actress and wife of former United States Senator Norm Coleman
 Todd Downing, former offensive coordinator of the Oakland Raiders and Tennessee Titans; born in Eden Prairie
 Chuck Foreman, former Minnesota Vikings and New England Patriots football player
 Jay Foreman, National Football League player; born in Eden Prairie
 Dan Gladden, former MLB player for Minnesota Twins, San Francisco Giants, Detroit Tigers, and Japanese Yomiuri Giants; radio broadcaster for the Twins
 Daerek Hart, professional gamer, particularly League of Legend
 Ben Husaby, 1992 & 1994 cross-country Olympic skier
 Dolal Idd, killed in a shootout with Minneapolis police in 2020
 Alla Ilushka, Miss USA 2007 contestant
 Jermaine Johnson II, defensive end for the New York Jets
 Nick Leddy, defenseman for New York Islanders
 Mark LeVoir, National Football League player
 Reynold Philipsek, jazz guitarist
 Allison Pottinger, world champion curler
 Kyle Rau, Florida Panthers forward
 Robert Remus, a.k.a. Sgt. Slaughter, wrestler
 Malik Sealy, Minnesota Timberwolves guard
 Nick Seeler, defenseman for the Philadelphia Flyers
 Sheila E., singer-songwriter, actress, percussionist
 Kenny Stills, wide receiver for Miami Dolphins; born in Eden Prairie
 Charlie Vig, chairman of the Shakopee Mdewakanton Sioux Community since August 2012
 Ryan Wittman, basketball player
 Ethan Wragge, basketball player with Gießen 46ers in Germanys

In popular culture
The city's regional shopping mall, Eden Prairie Center, stood in for the Mall of America in the 1997 comic mockumentary Drop Dead Gorgeous. Two years earlier, the mall served as the principal filming location of Kevin Smith's Mallrats.

The railroad overpass that lent its name to the 1990 Prince album Graffiti Bridge passed over Valley View Road in the city's northwestern quadrant. It was torn down in 1991 to make way for an expansion of the road and has since been replaced with a bridge carrying the Minnesota River Bluffs LRT rail-to-trail recreational path. Prince also owned a warehouse on Flying Cloud Drive to rehearse and record music; today, the site is occupied by TGK Automotive.

The cult television show Mystery Science Theater 3000 was filmed out of an industrial park in Eden Prairie for much of its original run.

References

External links

 Eden Prairie Chamber of Commerce

 
Cities in Minnesota
Cities in Hennepin County, Minnesota
Populated places established in 1858
1858 establishments in Minnesota